RV Callista is a research vessel belonging to the School of Ocean and Earth Science, University of Southampton, at the National Oceanography Centre, Southampton.  Callista is a  catamaran designed and equipped for a range of coastal and shelf research.

The vessel is fitted with a  A frame and associated winch, a  crane, a moonpool and facilities for diving operations. She carries a variety of sensors as standard and is equipped with both wet and dry laboratories. She is also fitted with bow thrusters for enhanced manouvrability.

Callista's main function is to provide seatime for students on courses run by the university and the NOCS.  In addition she is available for hire to commercial customers for up to six weeks a year.

References

External links 
 
 

Research vessels of the United Kingdom
University of Southampton